The Piedmont Triad (or simply the Triad) is a metropolitan region in the north-central part of the U.S. state of North Carolina anchored by three cities: Greensboro, Winston-Salem, and High Point. This close group of cities lies in the Piedmont geographical region of the United States and forms the basis of the Greensboro–Winston-Salem–High Point Combined Statistical Area. As of 2012, the Piedmont Triad has an estimated population of 1,611,243 making it the 33rd largest combined statistical area in the United States.

The metropolitan area is connected by Interstates 40, 85, 73, and 74 and is served by the Piedmont Triad International Airport. Long known as one of the primary manufacturing and transportation hubs of the southeastern United States, the Triad is also an important educational, healthcare, and cultural region and occupies a prominent place in the history of the American Civil Rights Movement.

The Triad is not to be confused with the "Triangle" region (Raleigh–Durham–Chapel Hill), directly to the east.

Counties 
As part of a redefining of metropolitan areas by the US Census Bureau, the old Greensboro–Winston-Salem–High Point Metropolitan Statistical Area was broken up in 2003 into five separate areas—three Metropolitan Statistical Areas and two Micropolitan Areas. In some ways, however, the region still functions as a single metropolitan area.

Municipalities 

The name in italics is the county in which the city is located.

Primary cities 

Greensboro Guilford – 299,035
Winston-Salem Forsyth – 249,545
High Point Guilford, Forsyth, Davidson & Randolph – 114,059

Secondary cities over 10,000 in population 
Burlington Alamance & Guilford  55,481
Thomasville Davidson  27,183
Asheboro Randolph  27,156
Kernersville Forsyth & Guilford  26,449
Clemmons Forsyth 21,163
Lexington Davidson – 19,632
Eden Rockingham 15,527
Reidsville Rockingham 14,520
Graham Alamance 14,153
Lewisville Forsyth 12,639
Archdale Randolph & Guilford 11,415
Mebane Alamance & Orange  11,393
Mount Airy Surry 10,388
Summerfield Guilford 10,232

Other municipalities under 10,000 in population 

Alamance Alamance 951
Bermuda Run Davie 1,725
Bethania Forsyth 328
†Biscoe Montgomery 1,700
Boonville Yadkin 1,222
†Candor Montgomery 840
Cooleemee Davie 960
Danbury Stokes 189
Denton Davidson 1,636
Dobson Surry 1,586
East Bend Yadkin 612
Elkin Surry 4,001
Elon Alamance 9,419
Franklinville Randolph 1,164
Gibsonville Guilford & Alamance 6,410
Glen Raven Alamance 2,750
Green Level Alamance 2,100
Haw River Alamance 2,298
Jamestown Guilford 3,382
Jonesville Yadkin 2,285
King Stokes & Forsyth 6,904
Liberty Randolph 2,656
Madison Rockingham 2,246
Mayodan Rockingham 2,478
Midway Davidson 4,783
†Milton Caswell 166
Mocksville Davie 5,051

†Mount Gilead Montgomery 1,181
Oak Ridge Guilford 6,185
Ossipee Alamance 543
Pilot Mountain Surry 1,477
Pleasant Garden Guilford 4,489
Ramseur Randolph 1,692
Randleman Randolph 4,113
Rural Hall Forsyth 2,937
Saxapahaw Alamance 1,648
Seagrove Randolph 228
Sedalia Guilford 623
Staley Randolph 393
†Star Montgomery 876
Stokesdale Guilford & Rockingham 5,047
Stoneville Rockingham 1,056
Swepsonville Alamance 1,154
Tobaccoville Forsyth 2,441
Trinity Randolph 6,614
†Troy Montgomery 3,189
Wallburg Davidson 3,047
Walkertown Forsyth 4,675
Walnut Cove Stokes 1,425
Welcome Davidson 4,162
Wentworth Rockingham 2,807
Whitsett Guilford 590
Yadkinville Yadkin 2,959
†Yanceyville Caswell 2,039

† Indicates municipalities in Montgomery and Caswell (counties usually locally included as part of Piedmont Triad)

Education

K–12 education 
The area is served by the Winston-Salem/Forsyth County Schools and Guilford County Schools. The area is home to a number of religious schools, as well as a number of independent schools including Wesleyan Christian Academy and High Point Christian Academy in High Point, Summit School in Winston-Salem, Forsyth Country Day School in Lewisville,  Greensboro Day School and Greensboro Montessori School in Greensboro.

Educational institutions 
More than 20 institutions of higher education are located within the Triad, including:

Alamance Community College
Bennett College
Bridges Christian College
Carolina University
Davidson-Davie Community College
Elon University
Forsyth Technical Community College
Greensboro College
Guilford College
Guilford Technical Community College
High Point University
North Carolina Agricultural and Technical State University
University of North Carolina School of the Arts
Randolph Community College
Rockingham Community College
Salem College
Surry Community College
University of North Carolina at Greensboro
Wake Forest University
Winston-Salem State University

Three prominent boarding schools also call the Triad home:  Salem Academy, Oak Ridge Military Academy, and the American Hebrew Academy.

Museums 
Major art and historical museums contribute to the cultural climate of the region, including the Southeastern Center for Contemporary Art (SECCA), The Reynolda House Museum of American Art, Old Salem, High Point Historical Museum, Mendenhall Plantation, the Weatherspoon Museum of Modern Art (located on the campus of UNCG), Blandwood Mansion and Gardens, the Greensboro Historical Museum, Guilford Battleground National Military Park, and the Charlotte Hawkins Brown State Museum.  The area also has its fair share of scientific museums, such as SciWorks, the International Civil Rights Center and Museum, the Wake Forest Museum of Anthropology, and the Greensboro Science Center. The North Carolina Zoo, the world's largest open-air natural habitat zoo, is located just outside the Randolph County city of Asheboro.

Economy 
The economy in the Piedmont Triad is a mixed economy.

Industry and manufacturing 
The Triad area is notable for large textile, tobacco, and furniture corporations. The Triad remains a national center for textile manufacturing, represented by corporations including Hanes based in Winston-Salem, Glen Raven, Inc. based in Glen Raven, and International Textile Group, based in Greensboro. Tobacco remains a prominent crop in the Triad's rural areas and many tobacco companies like Lorillard Tobacco Company of Greensboro and Reynolds American, based in Winston-Salem, call the Piedmont Triad home.  Numerous furniture manufacturers are also headquartered in the Triad area, especially in the cities of High Point (deemed the "Furniture Capital of the World"), Thomasville (known as the "Chair City"), and Lexington. The furniture and textile industries have in turn spawned large trucking, logistics, and warehousing businesses in the area.  Popular brands like "Thomasville" and "Lexington" are derived from the names of these cities. Recently, however, many furniture and tobacco factories have been closing and/or laying off workers across the region in response to escalating industrial globalization.

Technology and biotechnology 
After many of the old industries in the area began to die out, many Piedmont Triad cities began encouraging technological businesses to move into the Triad. Winston-Salem, for instance, founded within its downtown the Piedmont Triad Research Park, now known as Wake Forest Innovation Quarter, a highly interactive, 200-acre, master-planned innovation community developed to support life science and information technology research and development. Dell, Inc., in the early 2000s struck a deal with local officials allowing for the construction of a new computer assembly plant near the Triad city of Kernersville. Dell pulled out of its contract with the city, however, and left after only a few years.  Additionally, the University of North Carolina at Greensboro, the largest institution of higher learning in the region, and North Carolina A&T State University have joined forces to establish the Gateway University Research Park, a technology-based entity that will focus its efforts on a host of biological, life, and environmental science research projects.  Upon full build out of the project, it is expected to be housed by two  campuses, employ approximately 2,000 people, and generate $50 million per year to the Triad economy. LabCorp, one of the largest clinical laboratories in the world, has its corporate headquarters and several of its testing facilities in Burlington.

Shopping 
The following are the most prominent regional shopping centers/malls in the Piedmont Triad region:
 Four Seasons Town Centre, Greensboro
 Friendly Center, Greensboro
 Hanes Mall, Winston-Salem
 Alamance Crossing, Burlington
 Burlington Outlet Village, Burlington
 Holly Hill Mall, Burlington
 Tanger Outlets, Mebane
 Marketplace Mall, Winston-Salem
 Randolph Mall, Asheboro

Transportation

Primary highways 

The Triad is home to an extensive freeway network, which is in the process of undergoing a major expansion. Four major Interstate highways and numerous secondary Interstate routes and US routes serve the region:
Interstate highways
 I-40, the primary east–west route across the region. In the eastern Triad, it is conjoined with I-85.  The two routes split in Greensboro.
 I-840 (Painter Boulevard), part of the Greensboro Urban Loop, currently under construction.  When complete, I-840 will form the northern half of the loop.
 I-73, the primary north–south route across the region, much of which has yet to be constructed.  The route mostly carries portions of US 220 along it, with the exception of the portion along Bryan Boulevard, and another segment that shares the southwestern portion of the Greensboro Outer Loop, and was briefly designated as I-40 before its opening in February, 2008.  This portion was originally designated as I-40, with the current and original I-40 being re-designated as Business 40.
 I-74, running across the region from southeast to northwest.  Like I-73, much of the route has yet to be constructed, but several disjointed segments are currently open and signed as either I-74 or "FUTURE I-74".  The route enters the region from the south conjoined with I-73, and diverges from there north of Asheboro toward High Point.  The southern segment presently terminates at an intersection with I-40 east of Winston-Salem; new freeway is being built that will form the eastern segment of the Winston-Salem Beltway. The northern segment leaves US 52 in Mount Airy, heading northwest out of the region.
 I-274, currently only in the planning stages, is the proposed designation for the western half of the Winston-Salem Beltway.
 I-85, connects the region to Charlotte and points southwest.  Enters from the east conjoined with I-40, and splits from that route in Greensboro.
 I-85 Business (Green-85), a business route between Lexington and Greensboro,  consists of a former temporary alignment of I-85 that is a partial-controlled access highway.  A former northern segment, which received its designation when a new I-85 was opened as part of the Greensboro Urban Loop, is entirely freeway.
 I-285, connecting Winston-Salem to Lexington, is currently part of the US 52 freeway being upgraded to Interstate standards.
 I-785, connecting Greensboro to Danville, Virginia, the route is under development. It is currently part of US 29, much of which is not Interstate standard.
US highways
 US 29 runs roughly northeast to southwest across the region. Most of the route is either concurrent with, or parallel to Interstate highways, including I-785 (when completed) and I-85 (parallel).
 US 52 runs north–south through the region, serving as the main north–south freeway route through Winston-Salem.  The entire freeway is planned for upgrade to Interstate standards. North of Winston-Salem most of the route is scheduled to become part of I-74 (until Exit 140 where existing I-74 starts and travels west along its own freeway, and US 52 continues north into town via expressway), while south of the city it is cosigned with I-285.
 US 64 is an east–west highway through the southern Triad, connecting Asheboro, Lexington, and Mocksville.
 US 70 is an east–west highway that closely parallels I-85 through the entire region.
 US 158 runs roughly northeast–southwest across the region, terminating in Mocksville at US 601 and US 64, just south of I-40.
 US 220 is currently the primary north–south route through Greensboro, and travels nearly symmetrically through the middle of the region; most of the route runs along I-73, except between Greensboro and Summerfield where it is named "Battleground Avenue" .
 US 311 is a nominally north–south route that runs northeast–southwest between Danville, VA and Winston-Salem. The former alignment south of Winston-Salem has been fully signed as I-74; work has begun on US 311 signage removal on this alignment.
 US 421 enters the region from the southeast, and joins I-85 in Greensboro. It then takes I-85 South to I-73 North to western Greensboro. The route is then co-signed with I-40 briefly. After leaving Greensboro, it continues westward through Winston-Salem, the rural area of Yakdinville, and continues into Wilkesboro.
Other routes and highways
The Greensboro Urban Loop is a fully completed freeway that loops around Greensboro. The routes I-73, I-85, I-785, I-840, and US 421 are currently designated as part of the loop.
The Winston-Salem Beltway is an under construction freeway that will loop around Winston-Salem. As of 2022, the stretch between US 421/Salem Parkway in Kernersville to NC 66/University Parkway near Rural Hall is opened, and is designated as NC 74.
Wendover Avenue is primarily a four to six lane limited-access corridor that traverses through Greensboro from High Point. The route also bypasses downtown Greensboro. The road connects NC 68 to Interstate 73, U.S. 421, Interstate 40, US 220, US 29, and it continues as US 70 towards the east end of the route.
Silas Creek Parkway is primarily a four-lane limited-access corridor that serves as the partial loop that traverses in the western area of Winston-Salem. Most of the road runs with NC 67 and serves as a convenient way to Wake Forest University, Forsyth Tech, and Hanes Mall, for drivers on Interstate 40 and US 421.

Air

Piedmont Triad International Airport (PTI)

Mass transportation 
Piedmont Authority for Regional Transportation (PART) is the Triad's 10-county regional organization with the goal of enhancing all forms of transportation through regional cooperation. PART Express Bus provides express service to each major Triad city from Piedmont Triad International Airport, while Connections Express connects the Triad to Duke and UNC Medical Centers. PART also has Express Bus service to outlying counties that surround the Triad including Surry, Stokes, Davidson, Yadkin, and Randolph Counties and soon to be Davie County. PART is also administering and developing several rail service studies that include both commuter and intercity rail.

Government 
The region is served by the Piedmont Triad Regional Council (PTRC).  The PTRC was formed by the merger of the Northwest Piedmont Council of Governments and Piedmont Triad Council of Governments on July 1, 2011.  The PTRC is a membership organization of the 12 counties and 62 municipalities in the Triad region.

Protected areas 
The Piedmont Triad has several protected areas, which lay entirely or partly in the region:
Blue Ridge Parkway, partly within Surry and Wilkes counties
Boone's Cave Park, Davidson County
Deep River State Trail, partly within Guilford and Randolph counties
Guilford Courthouse National Military Park, Guilford County
Hanging Rock State Park, Stokes County
High Rock Lake, Davidson and Rowan counties
Haw River State Park, Guilford and Rockingham counties
Mayo River State Park, Rockingham County
Mountains-to-Sea Trail, partly within Alamance, Forsyth, Guilford, Stokes, Surry, and Wilkes counties
Overmountain Victory National Historic Trail, partly within Surry and Wilkes counties
Pilot Mountain State Park, Surry and Yadkin counties
Uwharrie National Forest, Davidson, Montgomery and Randolph counties
Wil-Cox Bridge at Yadkin River Park, Davidson County
Yadkin River State Trail, partly within Davidson, Davie, Forsyth, Surry, Wilkes, and Yadkin counties

Media

Newspapers 
The following are prominent newspapers in the Piedmont Triad region and the counties each newspaper covers.
 Greensboro News & Record, Guilford County
The Carolina Peacemaker, Guilford County
 ¨Hola Noticias¨, The Triad
 Winston-Salem Journal, Forsyth County
 Burlington Times-News, Alamance County
 Mebane Enterprise, Alamance County
 Courier-Tribune, Randolph County
 Thomasville Times, Davidson County
 The Dispatch, Davidson County
 High Point Enterprise, High Point, Guilford County
 Archdale-Trinity News, Randolph County
 The Stokes News, Stokes County
 The Reidsville Review, Rockingham County
 The Tribune, Surry, Wilkes, and Yadkin counties
 Mount Airy News, Surry County
 Qué Pasa, The Triad
 YES! Weekly, Guilford County, Forsyth County
 Triad City Beat, Guilford County, Forsyth County
 The Jamestown News, Guilford County
 The Stokesdale News, Guilford County
 Northwest Observer, Guilford County

Other 
The Old Gold & Black, a free daily student newspaper at Wake Forest University in Winston-Salem

Television stations 
All of the Piedmont Triad region belongs to the Greensboro/Winston-Salem/High Point television designated market area (DMA). The following are stations that broadcast to this DMA. These stations are listed by call letters, virtual channel number, network and city of license.
WFMY-TV, 2, CBS, Greensboro
WGHP, 8, Fox, High Point
WXII, 12, NBC, Winston-Salem
Spectrum News, 14, Greensboro (Charter Communications)
WGPX, 16, Ion, Burlington
WCWG, 20, CW, Lexington
WUNL-TV, 26, PBS/UNC-TV, Winston-Salem
WLXI-TV, 43, TCT, Greensboro
WXLV-TV, 45, ABC, Winston-Salem
WGSR-LD, 47, Independent, Reidsville
WMYV, 48, My, Greensboro

Radio

FM stations 
WFDD (88.5, News/Talk/Classical music, NPR affiliate), operated by Wake Forest University
WBFJ-FM (89.3, Contemporary Christian)
WNAA (90.1, Variety), operated by North Carolina A&T State University
WSNC (90.5, Jazz), operated by Winston-Salem State University
WQFS (90.9, Variety), operated by Guilford College
WXRI (91.3, Southern gospel)
WKRR (92.3, Classic rock)
WPAW (93.1, Country music)
WWLV (94.1, Contemporary Christian)
WPTI (94.5, Talk radio)
WHPE-FM (95.5, Christian talk)
WQMG (97.1, urban Adult contemporary)
WIST-FM (98.3, Regional Mexican)
WSMW (98.7, Adult hits)
WMAG (99.5, Adult contemporary)
WMKS (100.3, Contemporary hit radio)
WYMY (101.1, Regional Mexican)
WJMH (102.1, Rhythmic contemporary)
WUAG (103.1, Variety), operated by University of North Carolina at Greensboro
WTQR (104.1, Country music)
WFOZ-LP (105.1, Variety), operated by Forsyth Technical Community College
WVBZ (105.5, Mainstream rock)
WKZL (107.5, Top 40 Mainstream)

AM stations 
WSJS (600, sports)
WZOO (700, classic hits)
WPAQ (740, Americana and bluegrass)
WBLO (790, Spanish adult contemporary)
WTRU (830, Christian talk)
WPIP (880, religious)
WPCM (920, sports)
WPET (950, religious)
WTOB (980, classic hits)
WSGH (1040, Spanish)
WGOS (1070, Spanish religious)
WKTE (1090, oldies)
WMFR (1230, sports)
WCOG (1320, oldies)
WPOL (1340, gospel music)
WLXN (1440, Contemporary worship music)
WWBG (1470, oldies)
WLOE (1940, news/talk)
WSMX (1500, Contemporary Christian)
WEAL (1510, gospel music)
WDSL (1520, classic country, bluegrass, and gospel)
WBFJ (1550, Christian talk)
WYZD (1560, Christian)
WYSR (1590, Spanish)

See also 

I-85 Corridor
Piedmont Atlantic
Piedmont Crescent

References 

 
Regions of North Carolina